BWP (Bytches With Problems) was an American female rap duo that consisted of Lyndah McCaskill and Tanisha Michele Morgan.

BWP are perhaps best known today for their controversial music video "Two Minute Brother" from their 1991 album The Bytches.

In 1991, McCaskill and Morgan paid amateur videographer George Holliday $1,500 for the rights to use 10 seconds of the video he shot of L.A.P.D. officers beating Rodney King in their video for "Wanted." McKaskill said that "for years rappers have been talking about police brutality and no one has taken heed of it, or justice has never been done. No one's paid this issue any mind. So now that it's been taped, it's been caught in the act and visualized, it's in black and white...we truly hope people don't just forget about it a week later."

History 
The group became well known for their sexually explicit lyrics and were often referred to as a female version of 2 Live Crew.  The group released the successful album, The Bytches. Its follow up album, 1993's Life's a Bytch was, however, never released.

BWP made a cameo appearance in the 1992 romance comedy film, Strictly Business.

The follow-up album Life's a Bytch was released on YouTube after 27 years on September 24, 2020.

Discography

References

External links 

American hip hop groups
Women hip hop groups
American musical duos
African-American gender relations in popular culture
Hip hop duos
Columbia Records artists
American women rappers
African-American women rappers